Tyler McGregor (born March 11, 1994) is a Canadian sledge hockey player.

Early life
McGregor was born in Forest, Ontario on March 11, 1994, to parents Dean and Trudy. Growing up in Forest, Ontario, he started playing ice hockey when he was three years old and advanced to able-bodied AAA hockey before being diagnosed with spindle cell sarcoma.  As a result, in January 2010 McGregor underwent eight months of chemotherapy and the amputation of his left leg.

Career
Upon concluding treatment, McGregor was encouraged to try out sledge hockey by his former coaches. He started playing with a standing amputee team but soon switched to sledge hockey. McGregor began playing sledge hockey in 2011 and made the Canadian men's national para ice hockey team in 2012. In his international debut at the age of 18, he recorded a goal and two assists to help Team Canada win a silver medal at the 2012 World Sledge Hockey Challenge. The following year, McGregor became the youngest member of Team Canada to win a gold medal at the 2013 IPC Ice Sledge Hockey World Championships.

As a result of his success, McGregor was the second-youngest player named to Team Canada’s sledge hockey team for the 2014 Winter Paralympics, where he won a bronze medal. Following this, he collected 11 goals and 10 assists in six games during the 2015 International Ice Sledge Hockey Tournament to win a gold medal.

As a member of Team Canada at the 2017 World Para Ice Hockey Championships, McGregor recorded 12 goals to tie as the tournament leader and win a gold medal. Following the tournament, McGregor served as an alternate captain to bring Canada to a silver medal at the 2018 Winter Paralympics.

References

External links 
 
 

1994 births
Living people
Canadian sledge hockey players
Paralympic sledge hockey players of Canada
Paralympic bronze medalists for Canada
Ice sledge hockey players at the 2010 Winter Paralympics
Ice sledge hockey players at the 2014 Winter Paralympics
Para ice hockey players at the 2018 Winter Paralympics
Para ice hockey players at the 2022 Winter Paralympics
Medalists at the 2014 Winter Paralympics
Medalists at the 2018 Winter Paralympics
Medalists at the 2022 Winter Paralympics
Paralympic medalists in sledge hockey